Rock Creek is an unincorporated community in Hardin County, Illinois, United States. Rock Creek is north of Cave-in-Rock and northeast of Elizabethtown.

Notable people
Anna Pierce Hobbs Bixby, midwife, frontier doctor, dentist, herbologist, scientist.

References

Unincorporated communities in Hardin County, Illinois
Unincorporated communities in Illinois